NWA British Empire Heavyweight Championship may refer to:
NWA British Empire Heavyweight Championship (Toronto version)
NWA British Empire Heavyweight Championship (Vancouver version)

See also
NWA British Empire/Commonwealth Championship (New Zealand version)